Žiga Smrtnik (born 1 February 1994) is a Slovenian footballer who plays for Italian Promozione side Gemonese.

Career
On 6 June 2019, Italian Serie D club Tamai confirmed that Smrtnik had joined the club. He played for Tamai until the end of 2019, before moving to fellow league club Chions.

Notes

References

External links

NZS profile 
Žiga Smrtnik at TuttoCampo

1994 births
Living people
Footballers from Ljubljana
Slovenian footballers
Association football forwards
FC Koper players
NK Radomlje players
A.S.D. Cjarlins Muzane players
A.S.D. Pol. Tamai players
Slovenian PrvaLiga players
Serie D players
Eccellenza players
Promozione players
Slovenian expatriate footballers
Slovenian expatriate sportspeople in Italy
Expatriate footballers in Italy
Slovenia youth international footballers